Igor Leonidovich Zavozin (3 August 1955 – 29 May 2019) was a Russian Soviet ice dancer. With his former wife Elena Garanina, he represented the Soviet Union in international competition, winning the 1978 Nebelhorn Trophy and 1981 Winter Universiade, although they never made it to the World Figure Skating Championships due to the depth of the Soviet dance field. After turning pro, Garanina and Zavozin toured with Jayne Torvill and Christopher Dean. They were the parents of American ice dancer Maxim Zavozin and have since divorced. Igor Zavozin was also an international ISU judge for Armenia.

Competitive highlights 
(with  Elena Garanina)

References

External links
 Care to Ice Dance profile

1955 births
2019 deaths
Figure skating judges
Soviet male ice dancers
Universiade medalists in figure skating
Universiade gold medalists for the Soviet Union
Competitors at the 1981 Winter Universiade